Kunda is a town in the Viru-Nigula Parish of Estonia, located on the coast of the Gulf of Finland. Kunda is most famous for its cement factory, port and archaeological heritage.

History
Evidence of some of the oldest prehistoric communities in Estonia, hunting and fishing communities that existed around 6500 BC, were found near Kunda.
This settlement gave the name to the Kunda culture.

The first written record of Kunda dates back to 1241 - it was mentioned as a village. In 1443 it was mentioned as a manor.

Kunda was granted official borough rights on May 1, 1938.

International relations

Twin towns — Sister cities
The former municipality of Kunda was twinned with:
 Gdynia, Poland

Climate

Notable people
Argo Aadli (born 1980), theatre and film actor
Armin Öpik (1898–1983), paleontologist 
Ernst Öpik (1893–1985), astronomer and astrophysicist
Jüri Parijõgi (1892–1941), writer and scholar
Knudåge Riisager (1897–1974), composer, son of expatriate Danish parents (his father running the cement factory), spent his first 3 years in Kunda.

References

External links

Cities and towns in Estonia
Viru-Nigula Parish
Populated places in Lääne-Viru County
Former municipalities of Estonia
Populated places established in 1938
1938 establishments in Estonia
Port cities and towns in Estonia